The 1935–36 season was the 62nd season of competitive football by Rangers.

Overview

Rangers finished second in the league behind rivals Celtic. Rangers would win the Scottish league cup.

Results
All results are written with Rangers' score first.

Scottish League Division One

Scottish Cup

Appearances

See also
 1935–36 in Scottish football
 1935–36 Scottish Cup

Rangers F.C. seasons
Rangers